Iván De Jesús Álvarez Jr. (born May 1, 1987) is a Puerto Rican former professional baseball infielder. Born in Guaynabo, Puerto Rico, he went to high school at American Military Academy of Guaynabo and was selected by the Los Angeles Dodgers' in the 2005 Major League Baseball draft. DeJesus Jr. is the son of former major leaguer Iván DeJesús and a former major league batboy.

His Major League Baseball (MLB) debut with the Dodgers occurred early in the 2011 Major League Baseball season. He has since split time between the Major Leagues and various Triple-A affiliates, earning Triple-A All-Star recognition in 2014. He has also played in MLB for the Boston Red Sox and Cincinnati Reds.

Career

Los Angeles Dodgers
In 1987, he was born in Guaynabo, Puerto Rico. He went to high school at American Military Academy of Guaynabo, Puerto Rico. When his father was hitting coach for the Houston Astros organization, he served as batboy.  
DeJesus Jr. was the Los Angeles Dodgers' 2nd selection and 51st overall selection of the 2005 Major League Baseball Draft.

In 2005, he split time between the GCL Dodgers of the Gulf Coast League and the Ogden Raptors of the Pioneer Baseball League. He has played with the Columbus Catfish of the South Atlantic League in 2006 and with the Inland Empire 66ers of San Bernardino of the California League in 2007. He spent the 2008 season with the Jacksonville Suns of the Southern League. He was selected to play for the South Division of the Southern League All-Star Game, but he instead played in the 2008 All-Star Futures Game.  He ended 2008 with a 23-game hitting streak.  He finished second in the Southern League with 76 walks and tied for third with 150 hits.  He was selected to the Baseball America Minor League All-Star Second Team as a second baseman.  DeJesús was named 2008 minor league player of the year for the Dodgers organization.  DeJesús had been the Dodgers' sixth highest rated prospect and best defensive infielder prior to 2007.  He was listed as the #12 Dodger prospect prior to 2008 by Scout.com and #13 by Baseball America.

DeJesús played in the 2008 Arizona Fall League and the 2008–2009 Puerto Rican Winter League.  The Dodgers invited him to Major League camp as a non-roster player for spring training, however he broke his left leg in a home plate collision during a spring training game.  He returned to play four games for the Arizona League Dodgers in late August. The Dodgers added him to their 40 man roster prior to the 2010 season and promoted him to the Triple-A Albuquerque Isotopes, where he hit .296 in 130 games. He played for the Phoenix Desert Dogs in the Arizona Fall League after the season.

He made his Major League debut on April 1, 2011 against the San Francisco Giants. He played in two games with the Dodgers, striking out five times in seven at-bats before being optioned back to AAA Albuquerque on April 6. He was recalled to the Dodgers on April 12 when Rafael Furcal was placed on the disabled list. He recorded his first Major League hit on April 16 against the St. Louis Cardinals. On April 23, he took the field at the same time as his father when the Dodgers' pitched in the bottom of the eight inning at Wrigley Field. With the Cubs batting, his father was performing his third base coaching duties, while Junior entered the game as a defensive replacement. This was the first occurrence for a regular season game. After being sent back to AAA on May 13, and aside from a brief stint in the majors from June 4–6, he spent the rest of the season with the Isotopes, hitting .310 with 8 home runs and 59 RBI in 443 plate appearances and 100 games.  Following the conclusion of the 2011 AAA season, DeJesús was not among the post season callups by the 2011 Dodgers. for whom he had only had 35 plate appearances.

DeJesús lost his chance to make the opening day roster in 2012 when he suffered a torn oblique muscle in his side during a spring training game. On May 3, he began his rehabilitation with Albuquerque. The Dodgers recalled DeJesús on May 19. On June 1, 2012 DeJesús was part of a Dodgers lineup that featured the sons of five former Major Leaguers (along with Tony Gwynn Jr., Jerry Hairston Jr., Dee Gordon and Scott Van Slyke). This was the first time in Major League history that this had occurred. It was also the first time a starting infield of four major league sons had ever occurred: first baseman Van Slyke, second baseman Hairston, third baseman De Jesus and shortstop Gordon.

DeJesús was optioned to Albuquerque in late June. On July 16, 2012 Isotopes manager Lorenzo Bundy decided to start DeJesús in left field. It was DeJesús' first outfield appearance after 686 games of professional baseball. However, during his six innings in the outfield no balls were hit to left field. In 2012, DeJesús hit .273 in 23 games with the Dodgers and .295 in 60 games with the Isotopes.

Boston Red Sox

On August 25, 2012, DeJesús was traded to the Boston Red Sox along with James Loney, Allen Webster and two players to be named later (Jerry Sands and Rubby De La Rosa) for Adrián González, Josh Beckett, Carl Crawford, Nick Punto and $11 million in cash. On August 26, DeJesús was optioned to Triple-A Pawtucket. After batting .385 in his first seven games in the International League, he was called up to the Red Sox on September 2. With the Red Sox he had 8 at-bats and did not record a hit, striking out 6 times, including the final out of the season. He was designated for assignment by the Red Sox on November 20, 2012 and removed from the 40-man roster.

Pittsburgh Pirates
On December 26, 2012, the Red Sox traded DeJesús (along with Stolmy Pimentel, Jerry Sands and Mark Melancon) to the Pittsburgh Pirates for Brock Holt and Joel Hanrahan. DeJesús spent the 2013 season with the Triple-A Indianapolis Indians of the International League. In 103 games with Indianapolis he hit .319/.380/.457 with 3 home runs and 32 RBI. Following the season, he became a Minor League free agent.

Baltimore Orioles
On December 19, 2013, DeJesús signed a minor league contract with the Baltimore Orioles. He began the 2014 season with the Triple-A Norfolk Tides of the International League. He was named to the Triple-A All-Star Game in Durham, North Carolina. In 113 games with Norfolk, DeJesús hit .282/.358/.389 with 5 HR and 56 RBI as the team's shortstop.

Return to Boston
On August 30, 2014, DeJesús was traded with Jemile Weeks to the Boston Red Sox for Kelly Johnson and Michael Almanzar. DeJesús was assigned to Triple-A Pawtucket. On September 12, DeJesús tallied the game-winning two-run home run in the 13th inning of game 4 of the International League Championship Series against the Durham Bulls to force a decisive game 5. Pawtucket won the International League Championship the next day.

Cincinnati Reds
On November 23, 2014, DeJesús signed a minor league contract with the Cincinnati Reds, and subsequently played all four infield positions in 50 games for the Triple-A Louisville Bats, batting .303 with 16 RBI, prompting a call up to the Reds on June 3, 2015, after left fielder Marlon Byrd fractured his wrist during a game against the Philadelphia Phillies. He played for the Reds on June 5 against San Diego and then had his first major league home run on June 8 against Philadelphia.

DeJesús Jr. was sent outright to Triple-A Louisville on November 4, 2016. He elected free agency on November 13.

Milwaukee Brewers
On December 12, 2016, DeJesús signed a minor league contract with the Milwaukee Brewers. DeJesús hit .345 with 7 home runs and 65 RBI for the Colorado Springs Sky Sox. He elected free agency on November 6, 2017.

Third stint with Boston
On January 2, 2018, DeJesús signed a minor league deal with the Boston Red Sox that included an invitation to Spring training. Despite an impressive spring training, he was assigned to the AAA Pawtucket Red Sox where he began the 2018 season. He elected free agency on November 3, 2018.

Long Island Ducks
On March 14, 2019, DeJesús signed with the Long Island Ducks of the independent Atlantic League of Professional Baseball.

Chicago White Sox
On May 7, 2019, DeJesús's contract was purchased by the Chicago White Sox, and he was assigned to the Triple-A Charlotte Knights. He was released on July 8, 2019 after batting .238, slugging .347 and posting a .317 on base percentage in 22 games.

Minnesota Twins
On July 11, 2019, DeJesús signed a minor league contract with the Minnesota Twins and was assigned to the Double-A Pensacola Blue Wahoos. He was released on August 30.

Lexington Legends
On August 20, 2020, DeJesús signed with the Lexington Legends on the Battle of the Bourbon Trail. He became a free agent after the 2020 season.

See also

 List of Major League Baseball players from Puerto Rico

Notes

External links
, or CBS Sports, or Retrosheet

1987 births
Living people
Albuquerque Isotopes players
Arizona League Dodgers players
Atenienses de Manatí (baseball) players
Boston Red Sox players
Cangrejeros de Santurce (baseball) players
Charlotte Knights players
Cincinnati Reds players
Colorado Springs Sky Sox players
Columbus Catfish players
Gigantes de Carolina players
Gulf Coast Dodgers players
Indianapolis Indians players
Inland Empire 66ers of San Bernardino players
Jacksonville Suns players
Leones de Ponce players
Liga de Béisbol Profesional Roberto Clemente infielders
Lobos de Arecibo players
Long Island Ducks players
Los Angeles Dodgers players
Louisville Bats players
Major League Baseball infielders
Major League Baseball left fielders
Major League Baseball players from Puerto Rico
Naranjeros de Hermosillo players
Puerto Rican expatriate baseball players in Mexico
Norfolk Tides players
Ogden Raptors players
Pawtucket Red Sox players
Pensacola Blue Wahoos players
People from Guaynabo, Puerto Rico
Phoenix Desert Dogs players
Rochester Red Wings players
Senadores de San Juan players
Surprise Rafters players